The 1982 Avon Championships of California, also known as the Avon Championships of Oakland, was a women's tennis tournament played on indoor carpet court at the Oakland Coliseum in Oakland, California in the United States that was part of the 1982 Avon Championships Circuit. It was the 11th edition of the tournament and was held from February 22 through February 28, 1982. Second-seeded Andrea Jaeger won the singles title, her second consecutive at the event, and earned $30,000 first-prize money.

Finals

Singles
 Andrea Jaeger defeated  Chris Evert 7–6(7–5), 6–4
 It was Jeager's 2nd singles title of the year and the 9th of her career.

Doubles
 Barbara Potter /  Sharon Walsh defeated  Kathy Jordan /  Pam Shriver 6–1, 3–6, 7–6(7–5)

Prize money

References

External links
 International Tennis Federation (ITF) tournament edition details

Avon Championships of California
Silicon Valley Classic
Avon Championships
Avon Championships of California
Avon Championships of California